Walk All over Me is a 2007 Canadian film written by Robert Cuffley and Jason Long. The film stars Leelee Sobieski as "Alberta", a small-town girl who assumes the false identity of her former babysitter and current dominatrix roommate "Celene", played by Tricia Helfer. Lothaire Bluteau, Michael Eklund, Michael Adamthwaite, and Jacob Tierney also star in the film. It was directed by Cuffley and produced by Carolyn McMaster.

Walk All over Me premiere at the 2007 Toronto International Film Festival, where it was bought by The Weinstein Company.

Synopsis
Alberta leaves her small hometown to move to the city, and she moves in with her former babysitter, Celene, who wears thigh high boots and is now a professional dominatrix. Out of money, Alberta decides to impersonate her roommate's identity, lured by the $300 per hour pay rate. While working with her first client, Paul, three men break into the house, believing that Paul stole half a million dollars from them. Paul defends himself, saying that whatever money he has, he had won at the casino. Alberta flees the scene, grabbing Paul's money on her way out, which leads the robbers to believe that she is involved with the theft as well. For the rest of the movie, Alberta and Celene try to deal with the three robbers, and rescue Paul from them.

Cast
Leelee Sobieski as Alberta, a small town girl
Tricia Helfer as Celene, former babysitter of Alberta, and professional dominatrix
Lothaire Bluteau as Rene, club owner who believes Paul hides money from him
Jacob Tierney as Paul, newcomer to Vancouver
Michael Eklund as Aaron, an ex-convict and brother of Isaac
Michael Adamthwaite as Isaac, brother of Aaron, and works for Rene
Ross McMillan as Spencer, regular slave of Celene

Production
While the film is set in Vancouver, principal filming was actually done in Manitoba.

Reception

Reviews
On the review aggregator Rotten Tomatoes, the film has a 40% approval rating, based on five reviews.

Awards

References

External links 
 

2007 films
2007 drama films
Canadian drama films
English-language Canadian films
BDSM in films
Films directed by Robert Cuffley
2000s English-language films
2000s Canadian films